David Miller is a former American football defensive end. He played college football at Alabama-Birmingham. In his professional career, Miller was a member of the Arizona Rattlers, Edmonton Eskimos, Rio Grande Valley Dorados, and New York Sentinels.

High school career
Miller attended Cullman High School in Cullman, Alabama, and was a student and a letterman in football and track. In football, the Alabama Sportswriters Association (ASWA) named him to the All-State Team. As a senior, he was also named to the Birmingham News "Best of the Rest" and rewarded as his team's "Most Valuable Defensive Lineman." Miller played in the North-South All-Star Game after tallying 120 tackles and 22 sacks as a senior. He had 52 career sacks while playing at Cullman.

College career
At the University of Alabama at Birmingham, Miller was redshirted in 2002 as a true freshman. A versatile player, who played defensive end, defensive tackle, nose tackle, and linebacker, sometimes all in the same game. His primary position was defensive end, at which he started four years for the UAB Blazers and played in 46 contests.

Professional career

Arizona Rattlers
Miller was not drafted in the 2007 NFL Draft and decided to sign with the Arizona Rattlers of the AFL for the 2008 season. The Rattlers eventually waived him injured after he sustained a shoulder injury that required surgery.

UNGL
After coming off surgery Miller was the first defensive end selected by the Virginia Senators in the 2009 UNGL Draft, but due to insufficient financial backing the league was unable to get off the ground for its inaugural season.

Edmonton Eskimos
Miller was signed by the Edmonton Eskimos of the Canadian Football League in May 2009. He was released on June 28, 2009.

Rio Grande Valley Dorados
After being released by the Eskimos, Miller signed with the Rio Grande Valley Dorados of the AF2, playing the final three games of the season and helping them earn a 2009 playoff berth.

New York Sentinels
Miller was signed by the New York Sentinels of the United Football League., but was released during the 2009 season.

References

External links
 UAB Blazers Bio
 Arizona Rattlers Bio

American players of Canadian football
UAB Blazers football players
Arizona Rattlers players
Edmonton Elks players
Rio Grande Valley Dorados players
New York Sentinels players
1984 births
Living people
People from Cullman, Alabama
Players of American football from Alabama